Hambleton may refer to:

Places 
Hambleton District, a local government district of North Yorkshire, England
Hambleton Ales, a brewery originally based in Hambleton
Hambleton, Lancashire, England
Hambleton, Rutland, England
Hambleton, Craven, a location in North Yorkshire, England
Hambleton, Ryedale, a hamlet on the borders of Hambleton and Ryedale districts, North Yorkshire, England
Hambleton, Selby, North Yorkshire, England
Hambleton, West Virginia, USA

People with the surname
Aman Hambleton (born 1992), Canadian chess grandmaster
Greg Hambleton, Canadian music entrepreneur
Hugh Hambleton (1922–1995), Canadian and British economist and spy
Iceal Hambleton (1918–2004), USAF navigator and electronic warfare officer
Peter Hambleton (born 1960), New Zealand actor
Richard Hambleton (1952–2017), Canadian artist
Ronald Hambleton (1917–2015), Canadian broadcaster
Samuel Hambleton (United States Navy officer) (1777–1851), officer in the U.S. Navy who served during the War of 1812
Samuel Hambleton (Maryland congressman) (1812–1886), American politician
Steve Hambleton (born 1961), Australian doctor

Ships 
USS Hambleton (DD-455), a US Navy destroyer

See also
Hambleton Hills, a range of hills in North Yorkshire, England
Hambledon (disambiguation)